A slam dunk, also simply known as dunk, is a type of basketball shot that is performed when a player jumps in the air, controls the ball above the horizontal plane of the rim, and scores by shoving the ball directly through the basket with one or both hands. It is a type of field goal that is worth two points. Such a shot was known as a "dunk shot" until the term "slam dunk" was coined by former Los Angeles Lakers announcer Chick Hearn.

The slam dunk is usually the highest percentage shot and a crowd-pleaser. Thus, the maneuver is often taken from the basketball game and showcased in slam dunk contests such as the NBA Slam Dunk Contest held during the annual NBA All-Star Weekend. The first incarnation of the NBA Slam Dunk Contest was held during the half-time of the 1976 American Basketball Association All-Star Game.

Dunking was banned in the NCAA and high school sports from 1967  to 1976. Many people have attributed the ban to the dominance of the college phenomenon Lew Alcindor (now known as Kareem Abdul-Jabbar); the no-dunking rule is sometimes referred to as the "Lew Alcindor rule." Others have attributed the ban to racial motivations, as at the time most of the prominent dunkers in college basketball were African-American, and the ban took place less than a year after the 1966 NCAA University Division basketball championship game, wherein a Texas Western team with an all-black starting lineup beat an all-white Kentucky team to win the national championship.

Introduction

Joe Fortenberry, playing for the McPherson Globe Refiners, dunked the ball in 1936 in Madison Square Garden. The feat was immortalized by Arthur Daley, Pulitzer Prize winning sports writer for The New York Times in an article in March 1936. He wrote that Joe Fortenberry and his teammate, Willard Schmidt, instead of shooting up for a layup, leaped up and "pitch[ed] the ball downward into the hoop, much like a cafeteria customer dunking a roll in coffee".

During the 1940s and 1950s, 7-foot center and Olympic gold medalist Bob Kurland was dunking regularly during games. Yet defenders viewed the execution of a slam dunk as a personal affront that deserved retribution; thus defenders often intimidated offensive players and thwarted the move. Satch Sanders, a career Boston Celtic from 1960 to 1973, said: "...in the old days, [defenders] would run under you when you were in the air... ...trying to take people out of games so they couldn't play. It was an unwritten rule..." Still, by the late 1950s and early 1960s players such as Bill Russell and Wilt Chamberlain had incorporated the move into their offensive arsenal. At this time, dunking was a practice most commonly used by the tallest and biggest men (usually standing close to the hoop) to show their reach and strength. Then through the 1970s, players like David Thompson, Julius Erving and Darryl Dawkins popularized the move with more athletically executed dunks (with high-flying jumps and turns). This transformed dunking into the standard fare it is today.

Dunk types

Dunk types reflect the various motions performed on the way to the basket. They start with the basic one- or two-hand forward-facing dunk and go on through various levels of athleticism and intricacy. Discrete dunk types can be modified by appending other moves; for example, a player who passes the ball off the backboard, catches it in the air, and executes a double-pump dunk would be said to have completed a "self-pass off the backboard, double pump".

Double Clutch
At the onset of the jump, the ball is controlled by either one or both hands and once in the air is typically brought to chest level. The player will then quickly thrust the ball downwards and fully extend their arms, bringing the ball below the waist. Finally the ball is brought above the head and dunked with one or both hands; and the double clutch appears as one fluid motion. As a demonstration of athletic prowess, the ball may be held in the below-the-waist position for milliseconds longer, thus showcasing the player's hang time (jumping ability).

Whether the result of a 180° spin or body angle at takeoff, the double clutch is generally performed with the player's back toward the rim. While this orientation is rather conducive to the double clutch motion, Spud Webb was known to perform this dunk while facing the basket. Additionally, Kenny "Sky" Walker, Tracy McGrady—in the 1989 and 2000 NBA Contests, respectively—and others, have performed 360° variation of the double clutch (McGrady completed a lob self-pass before the dunk). Circa 2007, independent slam dunker T-Dub performed the double clutch with a 540° spin which he concluded by hanging on the rim.

Tomahawk

A Tomahawk dunk can be performed with one or two hands, and when two hands are used, it is called a backscratcher. Initially referred to as a gorilla dunk, that term is uncommon now. During the jump, the ball is raised above, and often behind the player's head for a wind-up before slamming the ball down into the net at the apex of the jump. Due to the undemanding body mechanics involved in execution, the tomahawk is employed by players of all sizes and jumping abilities. Because of the ball-security provided by the use of both hands, the two-handed tomahawk is a staple of game situations—frequently employed in alley-oops and in offense-rebound put-back dunks.

In one common variation, a 360° spin may be completed prior to or simultaneously with the tomahawk. Circa 2009, independent slam dunker Troy McCray pioneered an especially complex variant of the dunk: once the tomahawk motion is complete, instead of slamming the ball in the rim, a windmill dunk (see below) is then performed.

The two-hand backscratcher finish can exert tremendous force on the basket. In 1979, Darryl Dawkins twice shattered NBA backboards with tomahawk dunks leading to a quickly-enacted rule making it an offence to break the backboard. Technology has evolved to adapt to the increased strength and weight of players to withstand the force of such dunks, such as the breakaway rim (introduced to the NBA in 1981) changes to the material used for the backboards, and strengthening of the goal standards themselves.

Windmill
Before takeoff, or at the onset of the jump, the ball is brought to the abdomen and then the windmill motion is started by moving the ball below the waist according to the length of the player's fully extended arm. Then following the rotation of the outstretch arm, the ball is moved in a circular motion, typically moving from the front towards the back, and then slammed through the rim. Although, due to momentum, many players are unable to palm the ball through the entire windmill motion, the dunk is often completed with one-hand as centripetal force allows the player to guide the ball with only their dunking hand. In some instances sticky resins or powders may be applied to the palm, these are thought to improve grip and prevent loss of possession. Amongst players, subtle variations in the direction of the windmill depend on bodily orientation at takeoff and also jumping style (one-foot or two-feet) in relation to dominant hand.

There are a number of variations on the windmill, the most common being the aforementioned one- or two-hand variants. In these cases, the windmill motion may be performed with the previously discussed one-arm technique and finished with one- or two-hands, or the player may control the ball with two hands, with both arms performing the windmill motion, finishing with one or both hands. Additionally, the ball may be cuffed between the hand and the forearm—generally with the dominant hand. The cuff technique provides better ball security, allowing for a faster windmill motion and increased force exerted on the basket at finish, with either one or both hands. Using the cuffing method, players are also afforded the opportunity of performing the windmill motion towards the front, a technique exploited by French athlete Kadour Ziani when he pioneered his trademark double-windmill.

Occasionally in the game setting, the windmill is performed via alley-oop but is rarely seen in offense-rebound putback dunks due to the airtime required. Dominique Wilkins popularized powerful windmills—in games as well as in contests—including two-handed, self-pass, 360°, rim-hang, and combined variants thereof.

Between the Legs

For one-footed jumpers, the ball is generally transferred to the non-dominant hand just before or upon take-off; for two-footers, this transfer is often delayed for milliseconds as both hands control the ball to prevent dropping it. Once airborne, the dunker generally transfers the ball from non-dominant to dominant hand beneath a raised leg. Finally, the ball is brought upwards by the dominant hand and slammed through the rim.

The between-the-legs dunk was popularized by Isaiah Rider in the 1994 NBA slam dunk contest, so much so that the dunk is often colloquially referred to as a "Rider dunk" — notwithstanding Orlando Woolridge's own such dunk in the NBA contest a decade earlier. Since then, the under-the-leg has been attempted in the NBA contest by a number of participants, and has been a staple of other contests as well. Its difficulty — due to the required hand-eye coordination, flexibility, and hang-time — keeps it generally reserved for exhibitions and contests, not competitive games. Ricky Davis has managed to complete the dunk in an NBA game, but both he and Josh Smith have botched at least one in-game attempt as well.

Because of the possible combinations of starting and finishing hands, and raised-legs, there are many variations on the basic under-the-legs dunk—more so than any other. For example, in a 1997 French Dunk contest, Dali Taamallah leapt with his right leg while controlling the ball with his left hand, and once airborne he transferred the ball from his left hand, underneath his right leg to his right hand before completing the dunk. NBA star Jason Richardson has also pioneered several notable variations of the between-the-legs including a lob-pass to himself and a pass off of the backboard to himself. Independent athlete Shane 'Slam' Wise introduced a cuffed-cradle of the ball prior to initiating the under the leg transfer and finishing with two-hands. While a number of players have finished the dunk using one- or two-hands with their backs to the rim, perhaps the most renowned variant of the dunk is the combination with a 360°, or simply stated: a 360-between-the-legs. Due to the athleticism and hang-time required, the dunk is a crowd favorite and is heralded by players as the preeminent of all dunks.

Elbow Hang

The player approaches the basket and leaps as they would for a generic dunk. Instead of simply dunking the ball with one or two hands, the player allows their forearm(s) to pass through the basket, hooking their elbow pit on the rim before hanging for a short period of time. Although the dunk was introduced by Vince Carter in the 2000 NBA Slam Dunk contest, Kobe Bryant was filmed performing the dunk two years earlier in 1998 at an exhibition in the Philippines as well as Roy Hinson who performed the dunk during warm-ups for the 1986 NBA Slam Dunk contest. Colloquially, the dunk has a variety of names including 'honey dip', 'cookie jar', and 'elbow hook'.

In the 2011 NBA contest, Los Angeles Clippers power-forward Blake Griffin completed a self-pass off of the backboard prior to elbow-hanging on the rim. A number of other variants of the elbow hang have been executed, including a lob self-pass, hanging by the arm pit, a windmill, and over a person. Most notable are two variations which as of July 2012, have yet to be duplicated. In 2008, Canadian athlete Justin Darlington introduced an iteration aptly entitled a 'double-elbow hang', in which the player inserts both forearms through the rim and subsequently hangs on both elbows pits. Circa 2009, French athlete Guy Dupuy demonstrated the ability to perform a between-the-legs elbow hang; however, Guy opted not to hang on the rim by his elbow, likely because the downward moment could have resulted in injury.

Dunk modifiers
Discussed in this module are activities which when applied, modify a given dunk type. Modifier-activities occur prior to leaping or while airborne. Modifiers performed prior to leaping pertain to the manner of approach (e.g., locomotion or standstill), angle of approach (e.g., from the baseline), distance of leap from the basket, the addition of a pass (e.g., alley-oop), or some combination thereof. Modifiers performed while airborne pertain to bodily rotation (e.g., 360°), obstruction of own vision (e.g., arm-over-the-eyes), other bodily movements superfluous of dunk type (e.g., voluntary kicking of the legs), or some combination thereof. Dunk types can also be modified with obstructions (e.g., leaping over a car or person) which influence activities both prior to leaping and while airborne.

Modifiers are inherent to in-game dunking and conduce toward successful dunking as a means to score points. Modifiers are important in the grading of slam dunk contests because dunk types are made more difficult when modified (i.e., successfully executed modified-dunks ostensibly yield high scores in contests).

For taxonomic purposes it is an important distinction, but the modifiers discussed below are often considered dunk types in common parlance. This misconception is perhaps attributable to the modifier being the most salient component of the dunk from the perspective of the observer. However, each dunk modifier requires a dunk type to be a successful dunk—albeit the most-basic dunk type.

Alley-oop

An alley-oop dunk, as it is colloquially known, is performed when a pass is caught in the air and then dunked. The application of an alley-oop to a slam dunk occurs in both games and contests. In games, when only fractions of a second remain on the game or shot clock, an alley-oop may be attempted on in-bound pass because neither clock resumes counting down until an in-bounds player touches the ball. The images to the right depict an interval spanning 1/5 of a second.

Baseline dunk 

The baseline dunk is an approach-modifier of any dunk type in which the player approaches the basket along the court-boundary (baseline) which runs parallel with the backboard. In the game setting, the dunk often comes as the result of a pass, creating an assist opportunity for a teammate. In the contest, the baseline approach may be used as a means of convenience, facilitating a particular dunk type (e.g., passes bounced off the side of the backboard or its padding) or to increase the difficulty of a dunk type in hopes of meriting higher scores.

From a distance
This is a dunk where the player takes off from a distance which is significantly further away from the basket than is considered typical. The free-throw line is most commonly constituted as the take-off point, an effect likely attributed to the easily observable span between the line and the basket in the view of the TV audience. In order to achieve the hang-time and altitude necessary, players will generally leap from one foot to maximize the momentum generated from the half-court running start often required to complete the dunk. A cornerstone of dunk contests, dunks from a distance are also performed in games, most often on the fast break.

Free throw line
In the 1950s, Jim Pollard and Wilt Chamberlain had both dunked from the free throw line—15 feet from the basket. Chamberlain was able to dunk from the free-throw line without a running start, beginning his forward movement from within the top half of the free-throw circle. This was the catalyst for the 1956 NCAA rule change which requires that a shooter maintain both feet behind the line during a free-throw attempt.

In the 1976 ABA Slam Dunk Contest, Julius Erving dunked after leaping from the free-throw line, with his heel on the line, and has since been credited with introducing the free-throw line dunk to the general public.

In the 1988 NBA Slam Dunk Contest, Michael Jordan dunked from the free-throw line, in the same manner as Julius Erving, but parted his legs making his dunk more memorable than Erving's.

In the 1990 NBA Slam Dunk Contest, Scottie Pippen dunked from the free throw line. This was in the first round and Pippen received a score of 47 out of 50 for his dunk. Pippen, however, didn't proceed to the next round and the contest was won by Dominique Wilkins.

In the 1996 NBA Slam Dunk Contest, winner Brent Barry dunked from the free-throw line. Barry received 49 (out of 50) for the dunk.

In the 2011 NBA Sprite Slam Dunk Contest, Serge Ibaka dunked from behind the free-throw line, getting a score of 45 for the dunk, and finishing 4th.

In the 2016 NBL Pre-Season Challenge Slam Dunk Contest in Australia's National Basketball League, Adelaide 36ers 18 year old American import player Terrance Ferguson dunked from just in front of the free-throw-line.

In the 2016 NBA Slam Dunk Contest, Zach LaVine dunked from the free throw line on three occasions: One Hand, Windmill, and Between the Legs. All of the Dunks received a score of 50 for the dunk and won the Dunk contest.

Other
Other instances of dunks from a distance abound. James White in the 2006 NCAA Slam Dunk Contest successfully performed tomahawk and windmill variations of the foul-line dunk. Though he was unable to complete a between-the-legs from the foul line at that contest, he has been known to execute it on other occasions.

In the 2008 NBA Slam Dunk Contest, Jamario Moon leaped from the foul-line then, using his non-dominant hand, caught and dunked a bounce-pass from teammate Jason Kapono.

Independent 6'2" North American athlete Eric Bishop introduced a dunk entitled the 'Paint Job'. The title is in reference to the key on a basketball court, often known as 'paint' in common parlance. Approaching along the baseline with a running dribble, Bishop jumped with one-foot at the border of the key, dunked with one-hand while gliding over the key and landed just beyond the border on the side opposite his take-off—a 16-foot flight.

Effectiveness
A study was carried out in 2015 to show the effectiveness of different shot types, including slam dunks. The study was carried out across five different levels of basketball (NBA, EuroBasket, the Slovenian 1st Division, and two minor leagues). Overall the study showed that slam dunks were a very effective way of scoring in the game of basketball, particularly in the NBA, which had the highest dunk percentage in the study.

Notable dunks
Wilt Chamberlain was known to have dunked on an experimental 12-foot basket set up by Phog Allen at the University of Kansas in the 1950s.

Michael Wilson, a former Harlem Globetrotter and University of Memphis basketball player, matched this feat on 1 April 2000 and got into the Guinness World Records, albeit with an alley-oop.

Vince Carter dunked while leaping over 7-foot-2 (2.18 m) French center Frédéric Weis in the 2000 Summer Olympics. The French media dubbed it "le dunk de la mort" — "the dunk of death".

At least one player has performed a 720 degree dunk (that is, two full turns in the air): Taurian Fontenette also known as Air Up There during a Streetball game.

In the NBA Slam Dunk Contest

Several notable and remarkable dunks have been performed by participants in the annual NBA Slam Dunk Contest.

Spud Webb at  defeated  Dominique Wilkins in the 1986 contest.

Michael Jordan popularized a dunk referred to by some fans as the "Leaner". This dunk was so called because Jordan's body was not perpendicular to the ground while performing the dunk. TNT viewers rated it "the best dunk of all time" over Vince Carter's between-the-legs slam.

In the 2000 NBA Slam Dunk Contest Carter used an elbow hang along with his reverse 360 windmill dunk and between-the-legs dunk. When performed, much of the audience was speechless, including the judges, because none had seen these types of dunks before (Carter's first round 360 windmill dunk is reminiscent of Kenny Walker's 360 windmill dunk in 1989 except that Carter spins clockwise, whereas Walker spins counter-clockwise).

In the 2008 Sprite Rising Star's Slam Dunk Contest Dwight Howard performed the "Superman" dunk. He donned a Superman outfit as Orlando Magic guard Jameer Nelson tied a cape around his shoulders. Nelson alley-ooped the basketball as Howard jumped from within the key side of the free throw circle line, caught the ball, and threw it through the rim. This dunk is somewhat controversial, as his hand was not over as well as on a vertical plane to the rim. Some insist that it should in fact be considered a dunk because the ball was thrust downward into the basket, meeting the basic definition of the dunk.

During the 2009 NBA dunk contest, Howard had a separate goal brought onto the court, and the rim was noticeably significantly higher than a standard goal. Howard, after going into a 1950s-era telephone booth and again fashioning the Superman attire, caught a pass from Nelson and easily completed a two-handed dunk on the higher goal. While this was not performed for record-setting purposes, the dunk received a perfect score and a warm response from the crowd, in part because of its theatrics. Also in this contest, 5'9" guard Nate Robinson wore a green New York Knicks jersey and green sneakers to represent Kryptonite, playing on Howard's Superman theme. He used a green "Kryptonite" ball, and jumped over the 6'11" Howard prior to dunking. This dunk and the theatrics could have won the competition for Robinson, who was voted the winner by the NBA fans. Robinson then thanked Howard for graciously allowing him to dunk over him, asking the crowd to also give Howard a round of applause.

JaVale McGee currently holds the world record for Most Basketball Dunks in a Single Jump: three. While competing in the 2011 NBA Sprite Slam Dunk Contest, McGee jumped with two balls in his possession and dunked each prior to receiving and slamming an alley-oop pass from then teammate John Wall.

Broken backboards

In the past, it has been possible for players to dunk a basketball and pull the rim down so hard that the glass backboard shatters, either around the rim itself or, at times, shattering the entire backboard, or the entire goal standard fails. Reinforced backboards, breakaway rims, and in later years a design where the goal is mounted on the support arm of the stanchion, and on the glass, have minimized this at the college level and made it extinct at professional levels. The invention by Arthur Ehrat to create the breakaway rim with a spring on it led to the return of the dunk in college basketball.

All-star power forward Gus Johnson of the Baltimore Bullets was the first of the famous backboard breakers in the NBA, shattering three during his career in the 1960s and early 1970s. Luke Jackson also shattered a backboard in 1968: 

Darryl Dawkins of the Philadelphia 76ers was notorious for two glass-shattering dunks in 1979 resulting in the league threatening to fine him and eventually installing breakaway rims. Twice in his rookie season during games, center Shaquille O'Neal dunked so hard that he broke the hydraulic support of one goal standard (against the Phoenix Suns) and broke the welds holding up another goal standard, causing the basket to break off and fall to the floor (against the New Jersey Nets), although in neither case did the glass break. This resulted in reinforced backboard supports as well. During that same season, New Jersey's Chris Morris shattered a backboard in a game against the Chicago Bulls (the most recent shattered-backboard incident in the NBA to date). The NBA has made shattering the backboard a technical foul, although it will not count towards a player's count of seven that can draw a suspension, or two towards ejection from a game, and it counts towards a player's count of six personal fouls. This has assisted in deterring this action, as it can cost the team points.

In the ABA, Charlie Hentz broke two backboards in the same game on 6 November 1970 resulting in the game being called. In the NCAA, Jerome Lane shattered a backboard while playing for Pitt in a 1988 regular-season game against Providence, and Darvin Ham did the same while playing for Texas Tech in a tournament game against North Carolina in 1996.

The Premier Basketball League has had two slam-dunks that have resulted in broken backboards. Both came consecutively in the 2008 and 2009 PBL Finals, and both were achieved by Sammy Monroe of the Rochester Razorsharks.

Dunking in women's play

Dunking is much less common in women's basketball than in men's play. Dunking is slightly more common during practice sessions, but many coaches advise against it in competitive play because of the risks of injury or failing to score.

In 1978, Cardte Hicks became the first woman to dunk in a professional game during a men's professional game in the Netherlands.

In 1984, Georgeann Wells, a 6'7" (201 cm) junior playing for West Virginia University, became the first woman to score a slam dunk in women's collegiate play, in a game against the University of Charleston on 21 December.

As of 2018, 21 dunks have been scored by 7 different WNBA players. 7 of them were scored in All-Star games, while the remaining 14 took place during the regular season or playoffs. The first and second were scored by Lisa Leslie of the Los Angeles Sparks, on 30 July 2002 (against the Miami Sol), and 9 July 2005. Other WNBA dunks have been scored by Michelle Snow, Candace Parker (twice), Sylvia Fowles, Brittney Griner, Glory Johnson, Jonquel Jones, Elena Delle Donne, Awak Kuier, Tina Charles and Liz Cambage.

The record for the most WNBA dunks belongs to Brittney Griner. As a high school senior, she dunked 52 times in 32 games and set a single-game record of seven dunks. As a standout at Baylor University, Griner became the seventh player to dunk during a women's college basketball game and the second woman to dunk twice in a single college game. In her WNBA debut on 27 May 2013, Griner dunked twice. As of 2018, she has 13 WNBA dunks, including the first in a playoff game (25 August 2014).

At the 2012 London Olympics, Liz Cambage of the Australian Opals became the first woman to dunk in the Olympics, scoring against Russia.

Women in dunk contests

In 2004, as a high school senior, Candace Parker was invited to participate in the McDonald's All-American Game and accompanying festivities where she competed in and won the slam dunk contest. In subsequent years other women have entered the contest; though Kelley Cain, Krystal Thomas, and Maya Moore were denied entry into the same contest in 2007. Brittney Griner intended to participate in the 2009 McDonald's Dunk Contest but was unable to attend the event due to the attendance policy of her high school. Breanna Stewart, at 6'3" (191 cm), Alexis Prince (6'2"; 188 cm), and Brittney Sykes (5'9"; 175 cm) competed in the 2012 contest; Prince and Sykes failed to complete their dunks, while Stewart landed two in the first round but missed her second two attempts in the final round.

Use as a phrase
One of many sports idioms, the phrase "slam dunk" is often used outside of basketball to refer colloquially to something that has a certain outcome or guaranteed success (a "sure thing").
This is related to the high probability of success for a slam dunk versus other types of shots. Additionally, to "be dunked on" or to get "posterized" is sometimes popularly used to indicate that a person has been easily embarrassed by another, in reference to the embarrassment associated with unsuccessfully trying to prevent an opponent from making a dunk. This ascension to popular usage is reminiscent of, for example, the way that the baseball-inspired phrases "step up to the plate" and "he hit it out of the park," or American football-inspired phrases such as "victory formation" or "hail Mary" have entered popular North American vernacular.

See also
 List of sports idioms
 Slam Dunk Contest

References

External links

NBA.com: Destination Dunk
How To Slam Dunk - Training On Increasing Vertical Jump To Slam Dunk

Basketball terminology